Oregon Route 361 (OR 361) is an Oregon state highway running from US 26 and US 97 in Madras to US 97 near Culver. OR 361 is known as the Culver Highway No. 361 (see Oregon highways and routes).

OR 361 was established in 2002 as part of Oregon's project to assign route numbers to highways that previously were not assigned, and, as of July 2021, was unsigned.

Route description 

OR 361 begins at an intersection with US 26 and US 97 in Madras and heads south through Metolius and Culver.  Approximately 2½ miles south of Metolius, OR 361 ends at an intersection with US 97.

History 

OR 361 was assigned to the Culver Highway in 2002.

Major intersections

References 
 Oregon Department of Transportation, Descriptions of US and Oregon Routes, https://web.archive.org/web/20051102084300/http://www.oregon.gov/ODOT/HWY/TRAFFIC/TEOS_Publications/PDF/Descriptions_of_US_and_Oregon_Routes.pdf, page 30.
 Oregon Department of Transportation, Culver Highway No. 361, ftp://ftp.odot.state.or.us/tdb/trandata/maps/slchart_pdfs_1980_to_2002/Hwy361_2001.pdf

361
Transportation in Jefferson County, Oregon
Madras, Oregon